The Constant Lover may refer to:

Theatre
The Constant Lover, play by St. John Emile Clavering Hankin first performed posthumously in February 1912

Music
The Constant Lover, tune from the Dancing Master, 1719
"The Constant Lover", by Steve Tilston traditional
"The Constant Lover", by Magneta Lane
"The Constant Lover", from Jayne Mansfield: Shakespeare, Tchaikovsky & Me
The Constant Lover (EP)